Terenozek (Tereñözek) is an urban-type settlement and the administrative centre of Syrdariya District of Kyzylorda Region of southern-central Kazakhstan. It lies on the northern bank of the Syr Darya. Population:

Notable people
Pu Vladimir Nikolayevich, (1947-),  writer, now living in Korea.

References

Populated places in Kyzylorda Region